
Gmina Kolno is a rural gmina (administrative district) in Olsztyn County, Warmian-Masurian Voivodeship, in northern Poland.

Villages
Gmina Kolno contains the villages and settlements of Augustówka, Bęsia, Bocianowo, Gajówka Augustowska, Górkowo, Górowo, Kabiny, Kolenko, Kolno, Kominki, Kruzy, Lutry, Oterki, Otry, Ryn Reszelski, Samławki, Tarniny, Tejstymy, Wągsty, Wójtowo, Wólka and Wysoka Dąbrowa.

Neighbouring gminas
Gmina Kolno is bordered by the gminas of Biskupiec, Bisztynek, Jeziorany, Reszel and Sorkwity.

References
Polish official population figures 2006

Kolno
Gmina Kolno